Dr. D. A. Perley Elementary is a public elementary school in Grand Forks, British Columbia, Canada, part of School District 51 Boundary. It has 257 students.

Elementary schools in British Columbia
Boundary Country